Fenton Communications is a public relations firm that was founded by David Fenton in 1982. They describe themselves as the "largest public interest communications firm in the country", and maintain offices in Washington, DC, Los Angeles, San Francisco, and New York City. The CEO of Fenton is Valarie De La Garza. She succeeded Ben Wyskida as CEO in 2021.

Background

They specialize in public relations for not-for-profit organizations, and serve nonprofit, government, education and philanthropy clients dedicated to social justice and equity.   Their client list includes foundations and advocacy organizations such as the W.K. Kellogg Foundation, Annie E. Casey Foundation, Color of Change, Science Moms, The Volcker Alliance, RAICES and PWC's CEO Action for Diversity and Inclusion.

References

External links
 Official website

Public relations companies of the United States